Hallelujah Junction is the eighth ballet made by New York City Ballet ballet master in chief Peter Martins to  John Adams' eponymous music. The duo pianists appear in silhouette above the dancers throughout in Mark Stanley's lighting. The dance was made on the Royal Danish Ballet. The premiere took place on 24  March 2001 at the Royal Danish Theatre, Copenhagen. The NYCB premiere was on 22 January 2002 at the New York State Theater, Lincoln Center.

Original cast

Gitte Lindstrom
and four women in black
 
Andrew Bowman
Andrey Batalov
and four men in white

Notes

Reviews 
NY Times by Anna Kisselgoff, January 24, 2002
NY Times by Anna Kisselgoff, May 17, 2003

Ballets by Peter Martins
Ballets to the music of John Adams (composer)
2001 ballet premieres
New York City Ballet repertory